Ferdinand Schmidt may refer to:

People
 Ferdinand Joseph Schmidt (1791–1878), Austro-Hungarian explorer and naturalist
 Ferdinand Schmidt (author) (1816–1890), German author and educator